Laiyi can refer to:

Laiyi, Pingtung, Taiwan
An ethnic group of Dongyi, China